Chope Paljor Tsering is a former member of the cabinet of the Central Tibetan Administration. He is   the longest serving representative of the Dalai Lama, having served as the representative to Nepal, Eastern Europe, Australasia and East Asia over twenty one years from 1986 until 2007.

He was born in gNam-ru, northern Tibet, to a traditional Tibetan nomadic family in 1948. He became a refugee in Nepal in 1959 after his family fled Tibet after China’s People’s Liberation Army invaded their homeland. After completing his education he was appointed deputy secretary in the Central Tibetan Administration and was posted to take charge of a remote Tibetan refugee settlement in western Nepal from October 1973.

He subsequently served in the Central Tibetan Administration in numerous capacities. During that period Chope Paljor Tsering represented the Dalai Lama in Eastern Europe, Australasia and East Asia.

During his tenure as the Kalon for health, he was credited with initiating innovative healthcare related systems for the Tibetan refugees in India, including the Tibetan Medicare System (TMS), Telemedicine service and the Health Information System (HIS).

He is the author of "The Nature of All Things", an autobiography which recounts his childhood in Tibet, life as a refugee and his experiences in serving the Dalai Lama and Tibetan people.

After the completion of the term of the 13th Kashag in August 2011, Chope Paljor Tsering now lives in Australia with his wife and three children.

Publication 
 The Nature of All Things: The Life Story of a Tibetan in Exile, Lothian Books, 2004, 9780734407412

References

1948 births
Living people
Tibetan politicians
Government ministers of Tibet
Tibetan writers
Representatives of Offices of Tibet
Tibetan refugees